The 2013–14 KNVB Cup was the 96th season of the Dutch national football knockout tournament. The competition began on 28 August 2013 in the first round and concluded with the final on 20 April 2014.

AZ were the defending champions, having won the cup the previous season.
The winners qualified for the play-off round of the 2014–15 UEFA Europa League.

Participants 
82 teams participate in the 2013-14 cup. The 18 clubs of the Eredivisie and the 17 clubs of the Eerste divisie (excluding reserve teams) qualified automatically, entering in the second round. Other teams qualify by finishing in the top 12 of the Topklasse or by reaching the semi-finals in a local KNVB Cup, called 'districtsbeker', for clubs from level 3 onwards, in the previous season.

Calendar
The calendar for the 2013–14 KNVB Cup is as follows.

First round
36 amateur clubs competed in this stage of the competition for a place in the Second Round. These matches took place on 28 August 2013. 11 amateur teams received a bye.

Second round
The 18 winners from the First Round entered in this stage of the competition along with the 17 Eerste Divisie clubs, the 18 Eredivisie clubs and the 11 amateur club, that received a bye. These matches took place from 24 to 26 September 2013.

Third round
These matches took place on 29, 30 and 31 October 2013.

Fourth round
These matches took place on 17, 18 and 19 December 2013.

Quarter-finals
These matches took place on 21 and 22 January 2014.

Semi-finals

Final

References

External links
  

2013-14
2013–14 domestic association football cups
KNVB